The 1938–39 Coppa Italia was the 4th edition of the tournament under the organization of the Higher Directory. The competition was won by Ambrosiana-Inter.

Serie C elimination round 
Serie C qualifying and preliminary rounds were under geographical zones.

Replay matches

First round 
20 clubs are added (Piacenza, Mantova, Rovigo, Fiumana, Alfa Romeo, Biellese, Ilva Savona, Valpolcevera, Molinella, Pontedera, Ravenna, Civitavecchia, Aquila, MATER, Simaz Popoli, Cagliari, Cosenza, Potenza, Juventus Siderno, Palmese).

Replay matches

Second Round 

Replay matches

Serie B elimination round

Third round 
16 Serie B clubs are added (Padova, Vigevano, Fiorentina, Atalanta, Casale, Venezia, Pro Vercelli, Alessandria, Sanremese, Spezia, Anconitana-Bianchi, SPAL, Pisa, Siena, Salernitana, Palermo).

Replay matches

Round of 32 
16 Serie A clubs are added (Triestina, Bologna, Roma, Lucchese, Juventus, Genova 1893, Novara, Liguria, Torino, Milano, Livorno, Napoli, Ambrosiana-Inter, Modena, Bari, Lazio).

Replay matches

Round of 16

Quarter-finals

Semi-finals

Final

Top goalscorers

References 

rsssf.com

Coppa Italia seasons
Coppa Italia
Italia